Rahmadhani Hastiyanti Putri (born 28 January 1997) is an Indonesian badminton player affiliated with Djarum club.

Achievements

BWF International Challenge/Series 
Women's doubles

  BWF International Challenge tournament
  BWF International Series tournament

BWF Junior International 
Girls' doubles

  BWF Junior International Grand Prix tournament
  BWF Junior International Challenge tournament
  BWF Junior International Series tournament
  BWF Junior Future Series tournament

References

External links 
 

1997 births
Living people
People from Magelang
Sportspeople from Central Java
Indonesian female badminton players
21st-century Indonesian women
20th-century Indonesian women